Brancaleoni is a surname. Notable people with the surname include:

Gentile Brancaleoni
Giuseppe Soleri Brancaleoni (1750–1806), Italian painter
Matteo Brancaleoni (born 1981), Italian contemporary pop/jazz singer, actor, and journalist
Vincenzo Brancaleoni (died 1588), Italian Roman Catholic bishop